Khvansharaf (also Romanized as Khvānsharaf; also known as Khāneh Sharīf, Khān Sharaf, Khushara, Khūshāreh, and Khvoshāreh) is a village in Neh Rural District, in the Central District of Nehbandan County, South Khorasan Province, Iran. At the 2006 census, its population was 1,879, in 430 families.

References 

Populated places in Nehbandan County